The Vlașca is a right tributary of the river Teslui in Romania. It discharges into the Teslui in Popânzălești.

References

Rivers of Romania
Rivers of Dolj County